Voorwindia is a genus of minute sea snails, marine gastropod mollusks or micromollusks in the family Rissoidae.

Species
Species within the genus Voorwindia include:
 Voorwindia tiberiana (Issel, 1869)
 Voorwindia umbilicata Ponder, 1985

References

 Ponder W. F. (1985). A review of the Genera of the Rissoidae (Mollusca: Mesogastropoda: Rissoacea). Records of the Australian Museum supplement 4: 1-221

Rissoidae
Monotypic gastropod genera